Damon Evans (born November 24, 1949) is an American actor best known as the second of two actors who portrayed Lionel Jefferson on the CBS sitcom The Jeffersons. He also portrayed the young Alex Haley (ages 17–25) in the ABC television miniseries Roots: The Next Generations.

Biography
Born in Baltimore, Evans attended the Interlochen Academy on a Reader's Digest Scholarship. After graduation, he attended the Boston Conservatory of Music. While in Boston he appeared in productions of Two If by Sea, Hair, and The Corner at the Theatre Company of Boston.

His Off-Broadway credits include performances in A Day in the Life of Just About Everyone, Bury the Dead (for the Urban Arts Corp), and Love Me, Love My Children. He made his Broadway debut in The Me Nobody Knows. Other Broadway credits include Via Galactica and Lost in the Stars. He also toured as Judas and Jesus Christ in the authorized concert version of the musical Jesus Christ Superstar. He appeared in the Broadway musical Don't Bother Me, I Can't Cope.

In the late 1980s, Evans appeared in Trevor Nunn's Glyndebourne Festival production of the George Gershwin opera, Porgy and Bess, and again in the 1993 television adaptation of that production. In addition to Evans and other noted performers, this British production of Gershwin's 'American folk opera' featured the Glyndebourne Chorus and the London Philharmonic, both conducted by Sir Simon Rattle. Evans played Sportin' Life, a role originated by John W. Bubbles and originally written for famed 1920s and 1930s jazz bandleader and singer Cab Calloway.

References

External links 

1949 births
Living people
African-American male actors
American male stage actors
American male television actors
Boston Conservatory at Berklee alumni
Male actors from Baltimore
21st-century African-American people
20th-century African-American people